This article shows all participating women's volleyball squads at the 2006 Central American and Caribbean Games, held from July 15 to July 30, 2006 in Cartagena, Colombia.

Head Coach:

Head Coach:

Head Coach:

Head Coach:

Head Coach: Beato Miguel Cruz

Head Coach:

Head Coach: Juan Carlos Núñez

Head Coach: Tomás Fernández

References
 Official Site

C
Women's Squads, 2006 Central American And Caribbean Games
Central American and Caribbean Games